Ton is a comune (municipality) in Trentino in the northern Italian region Trentino-Alto Adige/Südtirol, located about  north of Trento.

Ton borders the following municipalities: Taio, Cortaccia sulla strada del vino, Vervò, Denno, Roverè della Luna, Campodenno, Mezzocorona, Sporminore, Spormaggiore and Mezzolombardo.

Demographic evolution

References

Cities and towns in Trentino-Alto Adige/Südtirol